The 1921 Chicago White Sox season involved the White Sox attempting to win the American League pennant. However, with the core of the team banned after the Black Sox Scandal broke, they fell back to seventh place.

Regular season 
Owner Charles Comiskey struggled to find replacements for his stars. For example, new third baseman Eddie Mulligan had a .623 OPS, lowest among the team's regulars and quite a drop from Buck Weaver's .785 in 1920.

The pitching staff took a much worse beating. Chicago had lost its two best starters in Eddie Cicotte and Lefty Williams and could not recover. Red Faber won 25 games with a league-leading 2.48 ERA. The only other pitcher over .500 was Dickey Kerr, who indeed allowed more hits and earned runs than anyone else in the majors. Number three starter Roy Wilkinson went 4–20, and nobody else started more than 10 games.

Season standings

Record vs. opponents

Roster

Player stats

Batting

Starters by position 
Note: Pos = Position; G = Games played; AB = At bats; H = Hits; Avg. = Batting average; HR = Home runs; RBI = Runs batted in

Other batters 
Note: G = Games played; AB = At bats; H = Hits; Avg. = Batting average; HR = Home runs; RBI = Runs batted in

Pitching

Starting pitchers 
Note: G = Games pitched; IP = Innings pitched; W = Wins; L = Losses; ERA = Earned run average; SO = Strikeouts

Other pitchers 
Note: G = Games pitched; IP = Innings pitched; W = Wins; L = Losses; ERA = Earned run average; SO = Strikeouts

Relief pitchers 
Note: G = Games pitched; W = Wins; L = Losses; SV = Saves; ERA = Earned run average; SO = Strikeouts

Awards and honors

League top ten finishers 
Red Faber
 MLB leader in ERA (2.48)
 #3 in AL in wins (25)
 #4 in AL in strikeouts (124)

Dickey Kerr
 MLB leader in earned runs allowed (162)
 MLB leader in hits allowed (357)
 #3 in AL in losses (17)
 #3 in AL in walks allowed (96)

Roy Wilkinson
 #2 in AL in losses (20)

References 
1921 Chicago White Sox at Baseball Reference

Chicago White Sox seasons
Chicago White Sox season
Chicago White